Jenny Ozorai (born 3 December 1990) is a Hungarian female hammer thrower and discus thrower. She competed at the 2008 World Junior Athletics Championships and claimed bronze medal which was her first international medal in the women's hammer throw. She has also represented Hungary in the senior level especially participated at the 2013 Summer Universiade.

She has also clinched 2 silver medals at the Hungarian Athletics Championships in 2009 and in 2012. Jenny graduated at the University of Southern California.

References

External links 
 
 Profile at Olympic.org
 Profile at Usctrojans.com
 Profile at European Athletics
 Profile at Athletic.net

1990 births
Living people
Hungarian female hammer throwers
Hungarian female discus throwers
People from Ajka
University of Southern California alumni
Sportspeople from Veszprém County
21st-century Hungarian women